The Commonwealth Judo Championships are an international judo competition, open to countries of the Commonwealth of Nations. Inaugurated in 1986, the Championships are held on a biennial basis, and are recognised by the Commonwealth Games Federation, and organised by the Commonwealth Judo Association. As Judo is an optional sport for the purposes of the Commonwealth Games, on the three occasions since 1986 that judo has been included in the Commonwealth Games programme, the Games judo tournament has doubled as the Commonwealth Judo Championships for that year; in 1990, 2002 and 2014. On these occasions, the host organising committee of the Games takes responsibility for organising the tournament on behalf of the CJA and CGF. From 2022, Judo will become a core sport in the Commonwealth Games schedule.

The Championships have been staged in the following cities:

 1986 Edinburgh, Scotland   
 1988 Coleraine, Northern Ireland
 1990 Auckland, New Zealand. Part of the 1990 Commonwealth Games
 1992 Cardiff, Wales
 1994 Gozo, Malta  
 1996 Vacoas, Mauritius 
 1998 Edinburgh, Scotland                           
 2000 Stephenville, Canada
 2002 Manchester, England. Part of the 2002 Commonwealth Games
 2004 Waitakere City, New Zealand
 2006 Derry, Northern Ireland
 2008 Vacoas, Mauritius 
 2010 Singapore 
 2012 Cardiff
 2014 Glasgow, Scotland. Part of the 2014 Commonwealth Games
 2016 Port Elizabeth, South Africa
 2018 Jaipur, India
 2019 Walsall, England
 2022 Birmingham, England. Part of the 2022 Commonwealth Games

Derry 2006 

The 2006 Commonwealth Judo Championships were held at the Templemore Sports Complex, Derry, Northern Ireland from 16 June to 18 June 2006.  The twenty competing teams were from:

 Australia
 Canada
 England
 Ghana
 India
 Isle of Man
 Jersey
 Kenya
 Malta
 New Zealand
 Nigeria
 Northern Ireland
 Pakistan
 Scotland
 Singapore
 South Africa
 Trinidad & Tobago
 Uganda
 Wales
 Zambia

External links
 Statistical analysis of the 2006 Championship
Judo at the 1990 Commonwealth Games, Auckland
Judo at the 2002 Commonwealth Games, Manchester

Judo
Judo competitions